The Jewel House: Elizabethan London and the Scientific Revolution is a history of 16th-century London by American scholar Deborah Harkness. It explores the alchemical community of London in the 16th century, focusing on key figures from the time period whose accomplishments led to a scientific revolution. According to WorldCat, the book is held in 1821 libraries. The book was published in 2007 by Yale University Press.

Reviews
The book was reviewed in Science; Times Literary Supplement;   American Scientist;  Technology and Culture; Bulletin of the History of Medicine; ISIS; Annals of Science; Canadian Journal of History,.; Renaissance Quarterly,;  Journal of Modern History; History; American Historical Review; Renaissance Studies;  Journal of British Studies; and Journal of Interdisciplinary History''

Awards 

 Winner of the 2008 John Ben Snow Foundation Prize for the best book published in any discipline of British Studies covering the period from 1400-1800.
 Winner of the Pfizer Prize for Best Book in the History of Science from 2005-2007.

References

Bibliography 

 

2007 non-fiction books
Yale University Press books
Books about the history of science
Elizabethan era